Ketan   is a town in the Western region of Ghana. It is 15 kilometres from the centre Sekondi-Takoradi  the Western regional capital. The serves as a dormitory town for workers who work in and around the Sekondi-Takoradi metropolis.

Boundaries
The town is bordered on Kojokrom  on the East, B.U on the West, Agric on the North and Baabakrom on the south.

References

Populated places in the Western Region (Ghana)